Sucy–Bonneuil is a railway station on RER train network in Sucy-en-Brie, Val-de-Marne, France.

History 
Sucy–Bonneuil station used to be served by the Bastille railway line (Paris Bastille – Marles-en-Brie), which has been running from 1872 to 1969. It is now served by RER line A.

Transport

Train 
The station is served by a train every 10 minutes at off-peak time in both directions, and by around 1 train every 15 minutes at late evening and early morning.

Bus connections 
The station is served by several buses:
  Noctilien network night bus line:  (between Paris (Gare de Lyon) and Boissy-Saint-Léger) ;
 Situs Bus network lines: 1, 2, 3, 4, 5, 6, 10 and 103.

Traffic 
2 121 295 people entered the station in 2014.

Gallery

References

Railway stations in France opened in 1969
Railway stations in Val-de-Marne
Réseau Express Régional stations